Bertram Richard Brooker,  (March 31, 1888 – March 22, 1955) was one of Canada's pioneer abstract painters. A self-taught polymath, in addition to being a visual artist, Brooker was a Governor General's Award-winning novelist, as well as a poet, screenwriter, playwright, essayist, copywriter, graphic designer, and advertising executive.

Early life
Brooker was born in Croydon, England, to Richard Brooker and Mary Ann (Skinner) Brooker. When he was seventeen, he moved to Portage la Prairie, Manitoba in 1905 with his family. There was a booming economy and a huge influx of immigrants from England and elsewhere in Europe wanting to better their lives. In Portage la Prairie, Brooker worked with his father at the Grand Trunk Pacific Railway in a menial capacity. He attended night school and was, as a result, given clerical work at the railway.

Career
After moving to Neepawa, a small town northeast of Brandon, Manitoba, in 1912, he and his brother, Cecil, rented a movie theatre. From 1911 to 1914, Brooker was active in local theatre productions in Portage and Neepawa. He directed a play called Much Ado About Something at the Portage Opera House, and he seems to have acted in a number of local productions. Brooker's success at writing for films and local theatre inspired him to pursue journalism and newspaper layout design in Neepawa and then back in Portage la Prairie. In 1913 he married Mary Aurilla ("Rill") Porter, whom he had met when both were members of the St. Mary's Anglican choir in Portage. In 1914 he became editor of the Portage Review, a local newspaper. In 1915 he enlisted in the Royal Canadian Engineers in Winnipeg. After the war he worked for The Winnipeg Tribune, The Regina Leader-Post and The Winnipeg Free Press.

He moved to Toronto, Ontario in 1921 and joined the staff of Marketing magazine. Brooker served as the magazine's editor and publisher from 1924 until 1926. In 1923, he published his first book, Subconscious Selling. In his social life he sought out like-minded persons with a passion for art and music. The Brookers' modest Glenview Avenue house in the middle-class neighbourhood of Lawrence Park became a meeting place for creative individuals, including the conductor Ernest MacMillan and the artists Charles Comfort, Paraskeva Clark, and Kathleen Munn.

Around 1922 to 1924 Brooker began working on a series of non objective paintings inspired by a profoundly mystical experience during a visit to the Presbyterian church in Dwight at the Lake of Bays in Ontario in 1923. This mystical experience reinforced his spiritualism and motivated him to attempt to render the mystical in art. Brooker began painting in an abstract style, and in 1927 held his first exhibition, organized by his friend Lawren Harris. That year his work was on display at the Canadian National Exhibition.  He was one of the first Canadians to paint in this style, although Kathleen Munn exhibited abstract paintings before Brooker exhibited his. Later, he was influenced in his development as an artist by LeMoine FitzGerald.

Brooker's first set of abstracts, from 1922 to 1924, and later works such as Ascending Forms, c.1929, appear to be inspired by the Vorticist paintings of Wyndham Lewis (1882–1957), David Bomberg (1890–1957), William Roberts (1895–1980), and Helen Saunders (1885–1963). The art of this group, particularly that of Lewis, used abstraction in sharp-edged lines to denote movement in a violent, slashing way. Brooker's first abstracts are influenced by the English group's use of precisely defined geometrical forms in aggressive contortions and highly saturated hues. Although Brooker imitated Vorticist and Futurist forms, he was by no means a proponent of the politics of those movements.

After meeting Winnipeg-born painter and printmaker, Lionel LeMoine FitzGerald, in 1929, Brooker undertook a major stylistic change, in accordance with his new friend's practice, and began to mingle naturalist and abstract elements in his work. Although he sometimes returned to pure abstraction and sometimes ventured into paintings that were essentially representational, much of his work from 1930 until the end of his life was a playful mixture of these two modes. The conjoining of two styles became the mark of his work after 1930.

In 1923 he joined the staff of the J.J. Gibbons Advertising Agency.

In 1931 Brooker was embroiled in a controversy about nudity in art when a painting of his was removed from a gallery exhibition because it contained nudity. Brooker later wrote the essay "Nudes and Prudes" in 1931 as a rebuke.

In 1936, Brooker's novel Think of the Earth (1936) became the first work to win the Governor General's Award for Fiction, although very few copies were sold. In 1940 he joined the staff of the MacLaren Advertising Co.

He was elected a member of the Royal Canadian Academy and the Ontario Society of Artists. He was a founding member of the Canadian Group of Painters and belonged as well to the Canadian Society of Painters in Water Colour.

In 1972, the National Gallery of Canada held Bertram Brooker: a retrospective exhibition which travelled nationally.

Brooker Bibliography
Subconscious Selling (1923)
Layout Technique in Advertising (1929), writing as Richard W. Surrey
Copy Technique in Advertising (1930), writing as Richard W. Surrey
Yearbook of the Arts in Canada, (1929–30, 1936) edited by Brooker
Elijah (1930), drawings
Think of the Earth (1936)
The Tangled Miracle (1936), writing as Huxley Hearne
The Robber (1949)
Sounds Assembling: The Poetry of Bertram Brooker (1980)

Source:

References

Bibliography 

King, James. Bertram Brooker: Life & Work. Toronto: Art Canada Institute, 2018. 

Reid, Dennis. Bertram Brooker, 1888-1955 Ottawa: National Gallery of Canada, 1973.

External links

 
 "Bertram Richard Brooker". The Canadian Encyclopedia.
 Bertram Brooker holdings at the University of Manitoba archives

1888 births
1955 deaths
Canadian economics writers
Canadian male novelists
20th-century Canadian painters
Canadian male painters
English emigrants to Canada
Naturalized citizens of Canada
British economics writers
English male journalists
Journalists from Manitoba
20th-century English painters
English male painters
Modern painters
People from Croydon
Writers from Manitoba
People from Portage la Prairie
Governor General's Award-winning fiction writers
English male novelists
20th-century English novelists
20th-century Canadian novelists
20th-century Canadian male writers
Canadian male non-fiction writers
20th-century English male artists
20th-century Canadian male artists